The royal insignia is the military insignia specially designed for Willem-Alexander of the Netherlands for use on his military uniforms after his investiture as King of the Netherlands in 2013. The King wears the insignia on his shoulder straps in lieu of the shoulder marks used as rank insignia in the Dutch Armed Forces.

References

External links 
 

Dutch monarchy
Military insignia
Military of the Netherlands